Selective percutaneous myofascial lengthening is a type of minimally invasive surgery utilized to relieve tension from muscle spasticity. It has been used to treat children who have cerebral palsy.

References

Surgical procedures and techniques
Cerebral palsy and other paralytic syndromes